Kapellen (from the German and Dutch word for "chapel") is the placename of several locations in Western Europe:

Belgium:
 Kapellen, Belgium

Germany:
 Kapellen-Drusweiler
 Geldern-Kapellen
 Grevenbroich-Kapellen
 Moers-Kapellen

Austria:
 Kapellen, Austria

Luxembourg:
 Capellen, in south-western Luxembourg

See also
 Capelle (disambiguation)
 Cappel (disambiguation)
 Kappel (disambiguation)
 Kapelle